Lars Hugo Elvstrøm (born 18 August 1949) is a former tennis player from Denmark.

Career
Elvstrøm was a regular member of the Danish Davis Cup team for 1973 to 1980 and played a total of 29 matches in 9 ties for his country.

His best result on the ATP Tour was winning the singles title at the Copenhagen Open, in 1976, beating Jean-François Caujolle in the final.

ATP career finals

Singles: 1 (1 win)

See also
List of Denmark Davis Cup team representatives

References

External links
 
 

1949 births
Living people
Danish male tennis players
Sportspeople from Copenhagen
20th-century Danish people